Grant was an electoral district of the Legislative Assembly in the Australian state of Victoria from 1877 to 1967.

The district was defined in "The Electoral Act Amendment Act 1876" which took effect at the 1877 elections.

Members for Grant
Two members were initially elected to the district, one after the Electoral Act Amendment Act 1888 which took effect in 1889.

Election results

References

Former electoral districts of Victoria (Australia)
1877 establishments in Australia
1904 disestablishments in Australia
1927 establishments in Australia
1967 disestablishments in Australia